Sinan Güler (born November 8, 1983) is a former Turkish professional basketball player.

College career
Güler played college basketball at Salt Lake Community College (JUCO), from 2002 to 2004, and at Carroll College (NAIA), from 2004 to 2006.

Professional career
After playing with the youth teams of the Turkish club Beşiktaş, Güler began his pro career with the senior men's team of Beşiktaş, during the 2000–01 season. After then playing college basketball in the United States, he returned to Turkey, and joined Darüşşafaka, before returning to Beşiktaş. He joined the Turkish club Anadolu Efes in 2008. With Efes, he won the Turkish Cup and Turkish Super League in 2009, and the Turkish Supercup in 2009 and 2010.

He moved to the Turkish club Galatasaray in 2013. He eventually became the team captain of Galatasaray. He won the European-wide 2nd-tier level EuroCup championship with Galatasaray in 2016.

On July 3, 2017, Güler signed a 2+1 contract with Fenerbahçe. In 2017–18 EuroLeague, Fenerbahçe made it to the 2018 EuroLeague Final Four, its fourth consecutive Final Four appearance. Eventually, they lost to Real Madrid with 80–85 in the final game. On August 6, 2019, Fenerbahçe exercised their option and released Güler from his contract.

On August 29, 2019, he has signed with Darüşşafaka of the Basketball Super League. 

On December 20, 2022, he announced his retirement from professional basketball.

National team career
Güler has been a regular member of the senior Turkish national basketball team since 2009. He is also the team captain of Turkey's senior national team. With Turkey's senior national team, he has played at the following tournaments: the EuroBasket 2009, the 2010 FIBA World Championship, where he won a silver medal, the EuroBasket 2011, the EuroBasket 2013, the 2014 FIBA Basketball World Cup, the EuroBasket 2015, and the 2016 Manila FIBA World Olympic Qualifying Tournament.

Personal life
Güler is the son of retired Turkish professional basketball player, Necati Güler who played (in 1975) and coached (in 1993) Fenerbahçe, and the younger brother of Turkish professional basketball player Muratcan Güler.

References

External links

Sinan Güler Official Website at sinanguler.com 
Sinan Güler at eurobasket.com
Sinan Güler at euroleague.net
Sinan Güler at fiba.com (archive)
Sinan Güler at fibaeurope.com 
Sinan Güler at tblstat.net

1983 births
Living people
2010 FIBA World Championship players
2014 FIBA Basketball World Cup players
Anadolu Efes S.K. players
Beşiktaş men's basketball players
Carroll College (Montana) alumni
College men's basketball players in the United States
Competitors at the 2009 Mediterranean Games
Darüşşafaka Basketbol players
Fenerbahçe men's basketball players
Galatasaray S.K. (men's basketball) players
Mediterranean Games bronze medalists for Turkey
Mediterranean Games medalists in basketball
Point guards
Salt Lake Bruins men's basketball players
Shooting guards
Small forwards
Basketball players from Istanbul
Turkish expatriate basketball people in the United States
Turkish men's basketball players